The first World Universities Congress (WUC) was organized and hosted by Çanakkale Onsekiz Mart University between October 20–24, 2010 to discuss the question of the responsibilities and duties of universities in the face of global problems.

The president of the congress was Prof. Dr. Ali Akdemir, the Rector of Çanakkale Onsekiz Mart University, and the co chair was Prof. Dr. Enver Duran, the Rector of Trakya University. Furthermore, the honorary president of the congress became Prof. Pier Ugo Calzolari who is the former Rector of Bologna University and the Vice President of International Association of Universities (IAU). During the congress, an attempt was made to establish the changes which need to be made by politicians, businessmen, NGOs, students, and universities in order to properly deal with the new global agenda. The most important emphasis of the congress was that “universities must adapt the innovations by undertaking new missions.”

Many countries and universities from all over the world - 250 universities and many rectors, academicians, politicians and the representatives of non-governmental organizations from 50 countries including mainly Australia with its 10 universities’ representatives, Germany with its many universities and European Countries, the USA, Balkan Countries, African and Asian countries attended the congress. 400 papers were published in the congress proceedings. Roughly 500 speakers including panelists, session speakers, keynote speakers and the ones who presented their papers have contributed to the congress.

During the congress 400 invited guests were hosted by Onsekiz Mart University and approximately 1000 domestic and foreign participants accommodated in the hotels in Çanakkale. The preparations for the congress have been lasted 4 years and all the institutions and corporations in Çanakkale have highly supported the congress.

The main idea asserted in all congress papers is to emphasize the importance of getting an important and meaningful position in business, social and political life or in NGOs depends on possessing a university degree from a university providing a highly qualified education. However, it was discussed that merely dispensing degrees is not enough and the roles and missions of universities need to be expanded and redefined. Today, universities cannot carry out their functions by isolating themselves from social and humanitarian issues and crises. Instead, in addition to their three common functions (training-educating, research, public service) they should also adopt as their missions the prevention and solution of global terrorism, global warming, natural disasters, crises, global starvation, inequity in income distribution, inadequate health and education services, regional conflicts and disasters due to global migration. The statistics on global terrorism and high armaments expenditure, global starvation, regional conflicts, expenditures made to achieve peace, unequal distribution of income, inadequate health and education services, global migration, global unemployment, environmental pollution, global warming and poverty require the intervention of universities both qualitatively and quantitatively.
With the aim of seeking answers to the question “What can world universities do in order to prevent the global problems? ”, the following themes have been discussed during the congress. 
 Redefining the concept of “university” under new conditions: the concept of university yesterday, today and in the future
 Understanding and preventing global climate change
 Preventing global terrorism 
 Eradicating global poverty 
 Solving the problems of global migration
 Eradicating inequalities in income distribution
 Eradicating injustice in health care services
 Eradicating inequality in educational opportunities
 Proposing solutions for environmental pollution
 Preventing regional conflicts and the outbreak of new conflicts
 Securing world peace
 Protecting cultural heritage
 Developing permanent solutions for fast population growth 
 Expanding the role of non-governmental organizations in local and international developments.

Following the closing panel of WUC, a global organization of Çanakkale Onsekiz Mart University, a declaration released to the World with the participations of many scholars who are expert is their fields in accordance with the outputs of the congress.

During the closing panel which was carried out in the presidency of vice-president of International Association of Universities Prof. Pier Ugo Calzolari, distinguished scholars made speeches respectively; Prof. Dr. Ali Akdemir, Çanakkale Onsekiz Mart University Rector; Prof. Ute Stoltenberg, Leuphana University Lueneburg; Prof. Dr. Enver Duran, Rector of Trakya University; Prof. Dr. Hilmi Ibar, Dean of Education Faculty of Trakya University, Dr. Garik Gutman, NASA; Assoc. Dr. John Hall, Deakin University; Prof. Dr. Mahir Nakip, Deputy Rector of Ahmet Yesevi University; Prof. Dr. Herald Hauptmann, Heidelberg University; Prof. Dr. Bernd Martin, Rector of Baden-Wuerttemberg Cooperative State University Loerrach and Prof. Dr. Jack Hawkins, Rector of Troy University.

The findings of the congress indicated that the main tasks of universities cannot be restricted only to training-education, research and public service subjects. As the global problems mentioned above are continually increasing and becoming more acute, universities cannot isolate themselves from these issues. They must become more involved and assume different roles to try and respond to some of the issues facing society. They can be active participants in many processes, take on new roles, such as peacemaker, mediator, entrepreneur, initiator, interactive participant, and the like. They can make recommendations to authorities and administrators, for example, that a reduction in the funds allocated to armaments must be transferred to university research projects in order to provide everybody with a more peaceful world. It will only then be possible to create an environment without hunger, poverty, conflicts and war. In this context, universities should reconstruct their institutions to offer solutions to global and chronic problems.

Higher education now constitutes an international sector and universities must seize the opportunities presented to them, cooperate and interact with NGOs and other institutions, and train professionals, employees, administrators and leaders who can function and respond to the needs of a changing world. The new generation of university administrators must emerge from their universities; rectors must become entrepreneurs and generate resources for high quality research and service to the community both locally and globally.

External links
 COMU, Official Website
 Turkish Universities, State and Private. From USAK Pages

References

Universities and colleges in Turkey
State universities and colleges in Turkey
Çanakkale
2010 conferences